Leucophenga varia is a species of fruit fly in the family Drosophilidae. It occurs in North America.

References

External links

 

Drosophilidae
Diptera of North America
Insects described in 1849
Taxa named by Francis Walker (entomologist)
Articles created by Qbugbot